Two Guys Abroad is a British film that was made in 1962 but was never released. It was intended as a pilot for a TV series or as a B movie. Neither eventuated.

Plot
A pair of Piccadilly Club owners continually get in trouble.

Cast
George Raft
Maxie Rosenbloom
Diane Todd
Diana Decker
David Lawton
 Barbara Lashbrook

Production
The film was shot at Shepperton Studios in March 1962. George Raft and Maxie Rosenbloom were old friends; Raft even once owned a share in Rosenbloom when the latter was a boxer.

Director Don Sharp later recalled "at the time there was a fashion for these 'products'. They were made for a double purpose: as a pilot episode for a TV series; if that failed, for release as a B movie supporting the main feature. Very few of them even made the grade."

Sharp said the film was made "on a very small budget in very minimal time... a terrible script." He said the film was made because Maurie Seuss had "come into money and wanted to make a movie"; Seuss had been George Raft's dresser.

Sharp says he "got on very well with George - the complete Hollywood pro. He was amiable, always ribbing Maxie; constantly doing his coin-flipping act; and likely at any moment to break into a few dance steps - for no particular reason. There is a photo of me and my camera operator on the camera dolly with George doing the grip's job and pushing it because he said, he always wanted a real job." Filming took three weeks. "We're just aiming to make a film that will entertain people for 75 minutes or so," said Suess.

References

External links

Films directed by Don Sharp
British drama films
1960s English-language films